Olga Grishenkova is a Russian ballet dancer, prima ballerina of the Novosibirsk Opera and Ballet Theatre, Honored Artist of Russia (2020).

Biography
In 2007, Olga Grishenkova graduated from the Novosibirsk State Choreographic School. In the same year, she was invited to the troupe of the Novosibirsk Opera and Ballet Theatre.

In 2020, the ballerina was awarded the title of Merited Artist of the Russian Federation.

Roles
At the Novosibirsk Opera and Ballet Theatre, the ballerina performs the roles of Odette/Odile (Swan Lake, chor. M. Petipa, L. Ivanov), Giselle (Giselle, or Vilisa, chor. J. Perrot, J. Coralli, M. Petipa in N. Dolgushin's version), Phrygia (Spartacus, Y. Grigorovich; Spartacus, G. Kovtun), Lady of the Dryads and Street Dancer (Don Quixote, chor. M. Petipa, A. Gorsky), Gamzatti (La Bayadère, chor. M. Petipa), Zobeida (Scheherazade, chor. M. Fokin), Gulnara (Le Corsaire, chor. M. Petipa, ed. F. Ruzimatov), Masha (The Nutcracker, chor. V. Vainonen), Magnolia and Countess Cherry (Cipollino, chor. G. Mayorov), Diana Mireille (Flames of Paris, chor. V. Vainonen, ed. M. Messerer), Princess Aurora (The Sleeping Beauty, chor. Nacho Duato) and solo parts in the ballets Chopiniana (chor. M. Fokin), Pulcinella (chor. K. Simonov), Grand pas from the Paquita ballet (chor. M. Petipa).

References

External links
 Ольга Гришенкова: «Опыт, который артист получил в жизни, ему всегда помогает на сцене». Sobaka.ru.

Russian ballerinas
Novosibirsk Opera and Ballet Theatre
People from Novosibirsk
Year of birth missing (living people)
Living people